Hollowell is a surname. Notable people with the surname include:

Alicia Hollowell (born 1984), American softball player
Barry Hollowell (1948–2016), Canadian Anglican bishop
Bud Hollowell (born 1943), American baseball player and writer
Donald L. Hollowell (1917–2004), American lawyer
Fred S. Hollowell (1883–1960), New York politician
Gavin Hollowell (born 1997), American baseball player
James Hollowell (1823–1876), English soldier and Victoria Cross recipient
Matt Hollowell (born 1971), American baseball umpire
Terri Hollowell (born 1956), American singer
T. J. Hollowell (Thomas Anthony Hollowell, born 1981), American football player